ROF Aycliffe, was a Royal Ordnance Factory built on an  site off Heighington Lane, Aycliffe, County Durham, England during the early 1940s.

"Aycliffe Angels"

The factory's workers included around 17,000 women from the surrounding towns and villages, who worked filling shells and bullets and assembling detonators and fuzes for the war effort. They became known as the "Aycliffe Angels" after a Nazi propaganda broadcast from Lord Haw-Haw threatened that "The little angels of Aycliffe won't get away with it" and promised that the Luftwaffe would bomb them into submission.

By its nature the work was very dangerous and many workers were killed and injured during the manufacturing process; however due to the secrecy surrounding the factory and its workers, many incidents went unrecorded and unreported in the news and their efforts went unrecognised.

In 2000 local newspaper The Northern Echo launched a campaign to have their work officially recognised, and this led to a memorial service which was attended by Prime Minister and local MP Tony Blair and the Queen. A permanent memorial was also placed in Newton Aycliffe town centre commemorating their efforts.

A blue plaque commemorating the women who worked there was unveiled in October 2021 by Durham County Council after a nomination by the Durham Women's Banner Group.

Operations
The marshy location was chosen as it was an ideal site, shrouded in fog and mist for much of the year, which provided cover against bombing by the Luftwaffe.

As a munitions factory, ROF Aycliffe operated 24 hours a day, employing over 17,000 workers in three shift groups. Most of the workers were women. They were transported from surrounding areas onto the site by bus and train, with the most local workers arriving on foot or by bicycle.

During its existence, the factory produced finished munitions including bullets, shells and mines. Operational for just over four years until the end of World War II in 1945, by which point it had produced some 700 million bullets and countless other munitions. The factory was designated as a 'Top Secret' installation and surrounded by high fences with barbed wire.

The factory was visited during the war years by Winston Churchill and members of the British Royal Family. Many well-known entertainers of the day also performed at the factory for the workers.

Post-war
After the war, the factory closed and the site was turned into the Newton Aycliffe Industrial Estate in the late 1940s. Many of the original buildings are still standing today.

References

 Newton News, Newton Aycliffe
 The story of 'The Angels'
 Great Aycliffe Town Council - Town History
Photographs and brief history of the Aycliffe Angels

Aycliffe
Buildings and structures in County Durham
History of County Durham
Royal Ordnance Factories in England
Newton Aycliffe